Péter Várkonyi (3 April 1931 – 14 October 2008) was a Hungarian politician, who served as Minister of Foreign Affairs between 1983 and 1989. After that he was the ambassador to the United States until 1990.

References
 Grotius
 NOL • Népszabadság Online • 15 October 2008

1931 births
2008 deaths
Politicians from Budapest
Members of the Hungarian Socialist Workers' Party
Foreign ministers of Hungary
Ambassadors of Hungary to the United States
Diplomats from Budapest